Crescentia portoricensis, commonly known as higuero de sierra, is a species of plant in the family Bignoniaceae. It is a perennial evergreen shrub endemic to Puerto Rico.  It is threatened by habitat loss.
C. portoricensis can grow up to 6 meters and produces a yellowish-white bell shaped flower that ripens into dark green fruits.

Habitat
Crescentia portoricensis can be found near stream banks or near highly moist soil in the southwestern wet forest areas of Puerto Rico.

References

External links
 

portoricensis
Endemic flora of Puerto Rico
Trees of Puerto Rico
Endangered flora of North America
Endangered flora of the United States